Porúbka is a village and small municipality in Bardejov District in the Prešov Region of north-east Slovakia.

History
In historical records the village was first mentioned in 1427.

Geography
The municipality lies at an altitude of 200 metres and covers an area of 2.965 km².
It has a population of about 237 people.

External links
 
http://www.statistics.sk/mosmis/eng/run.html

Villages and municipalities in Bardejov District
Šariš